The Thorpe reaction is a chemical reaction described as a self-condensation of aliphatic nitriles catalyzed by base to form enamines. The reaction was discovered by Jocelyn Field Thorpe.

Thorpe–Ziegler reaction

The Thorpe–Ziegler reaction (named after Jocelyn Field Thorpe and Karl Ziegler), or Ziegler method, is the intramolecular modification with a dinitrile as a reactant and a cyclic ketone as the final reaction product after acidic hydrolysis. The reaction is conceptually related to the Dieckmann condensation.

References

External links
 Thorpe-Ziegler reaction: 4-Phosphorinanone, 1-phenyl- Organic Syntheses, Coll. Vol. 6, p. 932 (1988); Vol. 53, p. 98 (1973) Link

Carbon-carbon bond forming reactions
Condensation reactions
Name reactions